WCOR is an AM radio station broadcasting in the eastern portion of the Nashville, Tennessee market with a power of 1,000 watts.

In its early years, WCOR functioned as a community-oriented station aimed primarily at residents of Wilson County, Tennessee. (It is licensed to the county seat of Wilson County, Lebanon). After this format became untenable in the 1980s (as it did for many small-town radio stations, particularly those located adjacent to major and mid-major markets), the station, after going dark for a period, resumed operation, marketing itself to particularly the eastern portion of the wider Nashville market. The majority of its programming now consists of a simulcast of its FM sister station, WANT, but some separate sports programming is also carried associated with Lebanon's Cumberland University.

In fall 2005, the station moved from the 900 kHz frequency, where it had spent nearly 60 years, to a newly licensed frequency at 1490 kHz.

The station is an affiliate of the Tennessee Titans radio network.

References

External links

Country radio stations in the United States
COR
Radio stations established in 2005